Abedini is an Iranian surname. Notable people with the surname include:

 Amir Abedini (born 1949), Iranian football club chairman
 Fardin Abedini (born 1991), Iranian footballer
 Hossein Abedini, Iranian actor
 Mojtaba Abedini (born 1984), Iranian Olympic fencer
 Reza Abedini (born 1967), Iranian graphic designer
 Saeed Abedini (born 1980), Iranian-American Christian pastor

Iranian-language surnames